Nate Leipciger (born 28 February, 1928 in Chorzów, Poland) is a Holocaust educator, public speaker and author.

Early life 
Forced to leave their home in Chorzów when the Germans invaded Poland, Leipciger and his family were moved to the Sosnowiec Ghetto. By 15 he had been transferred to Auschwitz-Birkenau. His mother and sister were murdered in Auschwitz, but his father kept close to his son. Leipciger ended up as forced labour in various other camps in Silesia. Twice he recalls his father saving his life. Once, Leipciger found himself in the queue for the gas chamber, only for his father to pull him out and bring him into the camp with him. On a second occasion, the Nazis were about to send his father to a factory in Germany, but he convinced one of the officers that his son was a useful electrician, so they let Leipciger accompany his father. According to Leipciger, his father begged a Nazi officer to get Leipciger to a factory in Germany to save him from being murdered at Auschwitz.

They were incarcerated in the concentration camps of Fünfteichen, Gross-Rosen and Flossenbürg before ending up at Waldlager V, part of the Mühldorf camp complex and a subcamp of the Dachau concentration camp where they were eventually liberated by American soldiers.

In June 1948, after living in Bamberg, Germany, for three years, Leipciger and his father immigrated to Canada.

The Weight of Freedom
In 2015, The Weight of Freedom was published,  a 280-page book written by Nate Leipciger, one of over 60 books in the Azrieli Series of Holocaust Memoirs by Canadian survivors.

"The Weight of Freedom presents a well-written description of life and death at Auschwitz-Birkenau and other slave labour and concentration camps. Told by a sympathetic narrator, the story is gripping, moving and insightful, “ wrote one reviewer.

Visit to Auschwitz-Birkenau with Prime Minister Trudeau

In July 2016, Nate Leipciger guided Canadian Prime Minister Justin Trudeau through Auschwitz Birkenau.

After, Leipciger reflected: "When Prime Minister Trudeau and I shed tears together in Auschwitz-Birkenau, never have I been more grateful for the welcome given to me by my adopted land, never have I been prouder to be a citizen of our beloved country, Canada. It was one of the most uplifting moments of my life."

The Prime Minister said, “This past July, I was privileged to walk the grounds of Auschwitz with Nate Leipgicer. It was a tremendously moving experience, one that will stay with me forever.”

Volunteer activities 

Nate Leipciger has been an active volunteer with numerous Holocaust and community organizations, including the Toronto Holocaust Remembrance Committee, The Canadian Jewish Congress, The Neuberger Holocaust Education Centre, The International Council to the Museum of Auschwitz-Birkenau,  Facing History and Ourselves and March of the Living, participating in the latter program 17 times.

In his book Witness: Passing the Torch of Holocaust Memory to New Generations author Eli Rubenstein quotes an exchange between Leipciger and one of the young Toronto students on the March of the Living.

Nate Leipciger: "You cannot have hate in your heart without being hateful against yourself. And that's the big problemwhen you are hateful, you become bitter, you resent everything and that becomes part of your nature." Student: "You don't hate the soldiers, who took those kids out [and murdered them]?" Nate Leipciger: "There is a difference between hating and holding them responsible. They are two different feelings. I don't have to like them, but I don't hate them. Because hate will destroy the person doing the hating."

References 

 
 

1928 births
Living people
Auschwitz concentration camp survivors
Dachau concentration camp survivors
Polish emigrants to Canada